Andrew Leigh Clarke  is a former senior Australian public servant who served as Secretary of several departments and as Chief of Staff to Prime Minister Malcolm Turnbull, before his retirement in April 2017. Since his retirement from the public service he has been appointed to the board of nbn™ and is to become chairman of the Australian Energy Market Operator (AEMO).

Life and career
Clarke has a Bachelor of Applied Science (Surveying) from RMIT University,  a Master of Science from Ohio State University, and a Diploma from the Australian Institute of Company Directors.

As a former surveyor who had worked in Australia and Antarctica, Clarke joined the Energy area of the Department of Industry, Tourism and Resources in 2002 and moved to the newly created Department of Resources, Energy and Tourism in December 2007.

Clarke was promoted to Secretary of the Department in April 2010.

Clarke was appointed Chair of the Australian New Zealand Land Information Council (ANZLIC) in 2011, to replace Warwick Watkins who was dismissed from the NSW Public Service for corruption.

Clarke was appointed to head the Department of Broadband, Communications and the Digital Economy in February 2013, an appointment for five years from 11 March 2013.

Following the elevation of Communications Minister Malcolm Turnbull to the Prime Ministership in the September 2015 Liberal leadership spill, Clarke became Turnbull's Chief of Staff.

Although originally agreeing only to establish the new prime minister's office and retire after the 2016 federal election, Clarke stayed on until he retired in April 2017.

He was appointed to the board of nbn from 22 August 2017 for a three-year term on 15 August 2017.

He was appointed to the board of CSIRO from 24 August 2017 for a five year term.

On 20 October 2017 the Australian Energy Market Operator AEMO announced Mr Clarke had been appointed Chair commencing 2 November 2017.

Awards

Clarke was awarded a Public Service Medal on the Queen's Birthday 2009 "for outstanding public service in driving significant reform of the energy market".

He was elected a Fellow of the Australian Academy of Technological Sciences and Engineering in 2011.

Clarke was appointed an Officer of the Order of Australia (AO) on Australia Day 2016 "for distinguished service to public administration, to communications and energy policy initiatives and reform, and to the spatial information industry".

References

Living people
Year of birth missing (living people)
Place of birth missing (living people)
Australian public servants
Officers of the Order of Australia
Recipients of the Public Service Medal (Australia)
Ohio State University alumni
NBN Co people
Chiefs of Staff to the Prime Minister of Australia
Fellows of the Australian Academy of Technological Sciences and Engineering